The Lost Moment is a 1947 melodramatic psychological thriller film with elements of horror directed by Martin Gabel and starring Robert Cummings, Susan Hayward and Agnes Moorehead.

The film was not well received at the time but its reputation has risen in recent years.

Plot
The movie mirrors some details of its source material and the broad outline of its plot, but it radically alters the characters, adding schizophrenia, a murder, and a fire.

A publisher, Lewis Venable, travels from New York to Venice, seeking to buy the 19th-century love letters of the late poet Jeffrey Ashton to a woman named Juliana Bordereau. He learns from a living poet, Charles Russell, that Juliana is still alive at 105.

Without announcing his intentions, Lewis assumes a false identity. He takes lodging at Juliana's and meets her great-niece Tina, a pianist.

In time, he discovers that Juliana is in dire need of money. She even offers to sell him a valuable painting at far too low a price. He also learns that Tina has dissociative identity disorder; at times believing that she is Juliana and the object of Ashton's love letters.

Charles tries to blackmail Lewis by threatening to reveal his true identity and his interest in acquiring the letters. Lewis comes to believe that Ashton was murdered and buried in the garden.  He prepares to leave, and in a chaotic scene, Juliana accidentally sets the house on fire. Lewis manages to rescue her from the burning house, but she dies almost immediately. The precious letters are consumed in the conflagration, and Tina steps into Lewis' embrace.

Cast
 Robert Cummings as Lewis Venable  
 Susan Hayward as   Tina Bordereau 
 Agnes Moorehead as Juliana Bordereau 
 Joan Lorring as Amelia 
 Eduardo Ciannelli as Father Rinaldo 
 John Archer as Charles 
 Frank Puglia as Pietro 
 Minerva Urecal as Maria 
 William Edmunds as Vittorio

Production
The film was produced at Universal Pictures by Walter Wanger, from a screenplay by Leonardo Bercovici based on the 1888 novella The Aspern Papers by Henry James. Bercovici wrote the script in 1946 for Charles Feldman who developed several projects for the property. Wagner bought the script in January 1947 for a reported $200,000. (In fact no money changed hands - Wanger bought the script in exchange for a scenario called The Washington Flyer.)

The script was called The Lost Love. Wagner said the script would be directed by Martin Gabel, who had just worked as producer on Smash-Up, the Story of a Woman for Wanger; that film starred Susan Hayward who would be in the new movie as well.

Wagner said the character of James Aspern was a combination of Shelley, Keats and Byron. He would change the name of Aspern to Ashton to avoid "exploitation of the Bayer product."

In late February, Robert Cummings signed to make the film, which was then called The Lost Love. (He was scheduled to do The Big Curtain for Edward Alperson afterwards.) Filming began March 10, 1947.

The set was not a tranquil one, with Hayward and Gabel quarreling over his interruptions of her line readings. After warning her director to stop, she reportedly picked up a lamp and threw it at him. Gabel never directed another motion picture.

In April the film was retitled The Lost Moment.

The music score was by Daniele Amfitheatrof and the cinematography was by Hal Mohr. The film stars Robert Cummings and Susan Hayward with Agnes Moorehead, Joan Lorring, Eduardo Ciannelli and Minerva Urecal.

The eerie atmosphere in the Venetian home was achieved through "tenebrous lighting, solemn rhythms and emphasis in music and sounds". Agnes Moorehead's makeover by  Bud Westmore into the 105-year-old woman was the subject of magazine articles for months after release.

Reception

Critical
The film was not well received by critics upon release, "written off as being rather gloomily literary." Bosley Crowther of The New York Times  considered the film to be "little more than the average horror", believing that Robert Cummings and Susan Hayward had little chemistry, saying "Miss Hayward performs as the daft niece with a rigidity that is almost ludicrous, and Mr. Cummings has the unctuous manner of a nice young undertaker as the publisher. Eduardo Ciannelli is professional, at least, as a priest." Newsweek said: "Frankly, admirers of Henry James have cause for complaint, and the average moviegoer will probably complain of boredom." The New Republic said that "Robert Cummings gives a performance that is probably meant to be sensitive but turns out to be unctuous". The New York World Telegram called the film "ponderous, majestic and thoroughly dull".

The film has sometimes been seen in a more favorable light. Time Out said that the film is a "remarkably effective adaptation of Henry James' The Aspern Papers, closer to the shivery ambience of The Innocents than to the oh-so-discreet charm of Daisy Miller or The Europeans." David Thompson said that the film was "beautifully shot". Hayward's filmographer Eduardo Moreno felt that the subtle characterization of the baffling heroine was one of her finest performances.

Box Office
The film recorded a loss of $886,494.

References

Additional sources

External links
 
 The Lost Moment at TCM
 The Lost Moment at Letterbox DVD

1947 films
1940s thriller drama films
1940s historical horror films
1947 horror films
1940s psychological thriller films
American thriller drama films
American historical horror films
American horror thriller films
Films based on short fiction
Films based on works by Henry James
Films produced by Walter Wanger
Films scored by Daniele Amfitheatrof
Films set in Venice
Universal Pictures films
American historical thriller films
American psychological thriller films
1947 directorial debut films
1947 drama films
1940s English-language films
1940s American films